The Eastern Parkway station was a station on the demolished BMT Fulton Street Line in Brooklyn, New York City. It had 2 tracks and 1 island platform and was served by trains of the BMT Fulton Street Line. The station was opened on November 18, 1889, one of three other stations along the line to open on that date. The next stop to the east was Pennsylvania Avenue. The next stop to the west was Atlantic Avenue, which it was in close proximity to. It was even closer to the still existing Sutter Avenue Station on the BMT Canarsie Line. It closed on November 17, 1918, and was replaced by Hinsdale Street Station.

References

Defunct BMT Fulton Street Line stations
Railway stations in the United States opened in 1889
Railway stations closed in 1918
Former elevated and subway stations in Brooklyn